Crassula umbella is a succulent plant species in the genus Crassula. It is endemic to the Cape Provinces of South Africa.

Distribution 
Crassula umbella is found from the Richtersveld and western Karoo through to the Little Karoo to Humansdorp.

Conservation status 
Crassula umbella is classified as Least Concern as it is widespread and not in decline.

References

External links 
 

Endemic flora of South Africa
Flora of South Africa
Flora of the Cape Provinces
umbella